was the eldest son of samurai lord Chōsokabe Motochika, and lived during the late Sengoku period of Japanese history. 

After the subjugation of Shikoku by Toyotomi Hideyoshi, Nobuchika and his father followed the Toyotomi into Kyushu Campaign. 
He died during the campaign against the Shimazu clan by Sengoku Hidehisa`s reckless operation in 1587. 
Nobuchika was caught in an ambush during the campaign against the Shimazu in Battle of Hetsugigawa.

Family
Great-Grandfather: Chōsokabe Kanetsugu (died 1508) 
Grandfather: Chōsokabe Kunichika (1504–1560) 
Father: Chōsokabe Motochika (1539–1599)
Child: daughter married Chōsokabe Morichika
Brothers:
 Kagawa Chikakazu (1567-1587)
 Chōsokabe Chikatada (1572–1600)
 Chōsokabe Morichika (1575–1615)

References

1565 births
1587 deaths
Samurai
Chōsokabe clan
Japanese warriors killed in battle